King's Rhapsody is a musical with book and music by Ivor Novello and lyrics by Christopher Hassall.

The musical was first produced at the Palace Theatre, London, on 15 September 1949 and ran for 841 performances, surviving its author, who died in 1951. It starred Novello in the title role of the heir to the throne under pressure from his long-lived mother, Queen Elana, to abdicate in favour of his infant son, with Phyllis Dare as his mistress Marta Karillos, Zena Dare as Queen Elana, Vanessa Lee as Princess Cristiane, Robert Andrews as Vanescu, and Olive Gilbert as Countess Vera.

A 1955 film adaptation was made, starring Errol Flynn.

Musical numbers
The Dancing Lesson
Birthday Greetings
Someday My Heart Will Awake
National Anthem
Fly Home, Little Heart
Mountain Dove
If This Were Love
The Mayor of Perpignan
The Gates of Paradise
Take Your Girl
The Violin Began to Play
Muranian Rhapsody (Ballet)
Coronation Hymn
The Years Together, theme from the score, used as a number in the film version.

Original Production
The production opened at the Palace Theatre, London, on 15 September 1949 and ran for 841 performances. It was directed by Murray MacDonald, with the following cast:

Princess Cristiane – Vanessa Lee
Countess Vera Lemainken, her companion – Olive Gilbert
King Peter of Norseland, Cristiane's father – Victor Bogetti
Princesses Kirsten and Hulda, Cristiane's little cousins – Pamela Harrington and Wendy Warren
Marta Karillos – Phyllis Dare 
Queen Elana of Murania – Zena Dare 
Prime Minister Vanescu – Robert Andrews 
Nikki – Ivor Novello
Jules, Nikki's valet – Michael Anthony
Count Egon Stanieff, of the Royal Guard – Denis Martin
Countess Olga Varsov, a lady in waiting – Anne Pinder
Madame Koska, a modest – Jaqueline Le Geyt
Mr. Trontzen, a dance master – John Palmer
Major Domo – Eric Sutherland 
Manservant – Harry Fergusson 
Tormas – Gordon Duttson 
Boy King – John Young
Chorus of Norseland village peasants, mannequins, serenaders, palace guards and servants, courtiers, members of the Muranian Royal Ballet Company, and people of Murania.

The dancers were played by the Pauline Grant Ballet.

Critical reception
In The Observer, Ivor Brown was of the opinion that Novello, "can with his tranquility stand up to all the bounding Oklahomans and Brigadooners in the world"; and in The Sunday Times, Harold Hobson considered it "a better musical than South Pacific."

Adaptations
The musical was novelised in 1950 by Hester W. Chapman. The 1955 British film version was directed by Herbert Wilcox, and starred Errol Flynn as Nikki and Anna Neagle as his mistress. A condensed 45-minute version, taken from the film's soundtrack, was broadcast as a BBC Radio play in September 1955.

The piece was produced for BBC Radio in 1950, 1951, 1968 and 1993 to celebrate the 100th anniversary of Novello's birth.

A television version was broadcast in 1957 by the BBC, who (according to the Radio Times) "ingeniously cut the three and a quarter hours of the original action to an hour and a half." Vanessa Lee reprised her role of Princess Cristiane from the original stage production, and Griffith Jones played Nikki, with Margot Grahame as his mistress.

Further reading
Traubner, Richard. Operetta: A Theatrical History (2003), Routledge

References

External links
King's Rhapsody at Theatricalia
Ivor Novello Musicals (archived)
King's Rhapsody at Beeston Musical Theatre Group (archived)

1949 musicals
West End musicals
Musicals by Ivor Novello
British musicals